The Journal of Animal Ecology is a bimonthly peer-reviewed scientific journal publishing research in all areas of animal ecology. It began publication in 1932, and as such is the second oldest journal of the British Ecological Society (after Journal of Ecology).

Types of papers published 
The journal publishes the following types of papers:
 Research Articles - a typical experimental, comparative or theoretical paper
 Concepts -  short essays on emerging ideas and research areas or novel perspectives on classic concepts
 Reviews - syntheses of topics of broad ecological interest
 Research Methods Guides - instructional papers that aim to serve as a practical guide for animal ecologists in using a specific experimental or theoretical model or system, or software package
 Long-term Studies in Animal Ecology- balanced, comprehensive and concise syntheses of well-established field or laboratory study systems whilst providing future research directions and/or paradigm shifts
 Forum articles - short contributions intended to stimulate debate
 Research Highlights- short articles designed to highlight high-interest material

Abstracting and indexing 
The journal is abstracted and indexed in Cambridge Scientific Abstracts, Elsevier Biobase/Current Awareness in Biological Sciences, Current Contents, GEOBASE, and the Science Citation Index Expanded. According to the Journal Citation Reports, the journal has a 2021 impact factor of 5.600.

See also 
 Journal of Applied Ecology
 Functional Ecology
 Methods in Ecology and Evolution

References

External links 

Ecology journals
Wiley-Blackwell academic journals
British Ecological Society academic journals
Publications established in 1932
English-language journals